Ursula Lohn  (born 7 November 1966 in Cologne) is a German footballer who played as a midfielder for the Germany women's national football team. She was part of the team at the 1995 FIFA Women's World Cup. At the club level, she played for TuS Ahrbach in Germany.

International goals

References

External links
 

1966 births
Living people
German women's footballers
Germany women's international footballers
Footballers from Cologne
1995 FIFA Women's World Cup players
Women's association football midfielders
UEFA Women's Championship-winning players